Atlantic Balloon Crossing is a video game written by Dean Powell for the TRS-80 and published by The Software Exchange in 1979. It was originally printed as a type-in BASIC listing in the June 1979 issue of SoftSide magazine.

Gameplay
Atlantic Balloon Crossing is a game in which players control gas balloons to try to cross the Atlantic Ocean starting in Canada to reach Paris in the shortest time possible.

Reception
Joseph Suchar reviewed Atlantic Balloon Crossing in The Space Gamer No. 37. Suchar commented that "I feel that this game is well worth the money. It provides a challenging multi-player or solitaire game which is difficult to optimize."

References

1979 video games
Simulation video games
TRS-80 games
TRS-80-only games
Video games developed in the United States